Saskia Maurer (born 29 July 2001) is a Swiss ice hockey goaltender and member of the Swiss national ice hockey team, currently playing with the St. Thomas Tommies women's ice hockey program in the Western Collegiate Hockey Association (WCHA) conference of the NCAA Division I.

Maurer represented Switzerland in the women's ice hockey tournament at the 2022 Winter Olympics in Beijing and at the IIHF Women's World Championship in 2019, 2021, and 2022. As a junior player with the Swiss national under-18 team, she participated in the IIHF U18 Women's World Championship in 2017, 2018, and 2019. At the 2016 Winter Youth Olympics in Lillehammer, she won a bronze medal with the Swiss under-16 team in the girls' ice hockey tournament.

References

External links
 
 

2001 births
Living people
Ice hockey players at the 2022 Winter Olympics
Ice hockey players at the 2016 Winter Youth Olympics
Olympic ice hockey players of Switzerland
People from Emmental District
Sportspeople from the canton of Bern
St. Thomas (Minnesota) Tommies women's ice hockey players
Swiss expatriate ice hockey people
Swiss women's ice hockey goaltenders
Swiss Women's League players
Youth Olympic bronze medalists for Switzerland